Peter Wagener Grayson (1788–1838) was an attorney, diplomat, cabinet officer, and presidential candidate in the Republic of Texas. He was the son of Benjamin and Caroline (Taylor) Grayson, and was born in Bardstown, Virginia (later Kentucky), in 1788. He owned a plantation near Matagorda, Texas.

Grayson helped raise United States volunteers for the Texas Revolution, and he was appointed by President Sam Houston as Texas attorney general in February 1837 and as naval agent to the United States in December 1837.

In 1838, Grayson was the Houston party candidate for president of the Republic of Texas. On July 9 of that year he fatally shot himself.

Sources
Nina Covington, "The Presidential Campaigns of the Republic of Texas of 1836 and 1838" (M.A. thesis, University of Texas, 1929). 
Handbook of Texas Online entry on Grayson
historical marker about Grayson

1788 births
American emigrants to Mexico
1838 deaths
19th-century American politicians
Texas Attorneys General